Etienne van der Linde (born 25 February 1978 in Johannesburg) is a South African racing driver. He has competed in such series as Euro Formula 3000 and the German Formula Three Championship.

References

External links
 Official website
 

1978 births
Living people
Sportspeople from Johannesburg
South African racing drivers
Afrikaner people
South African people of Dutch descent
British Formula Renault 2.0 drivers
German Formula Three Championship drivers
Auto GP drivers

Van Amersfoort Racing drivers